Korona Kielce, (Korona – Crown – symbol of club and city, Kielce – name of city where club is based) is a Polish football club, which will compete in Ekstraklasa in the 2022–23 season. In the years 2002–08 the club belonged to Polish holding company Kolporter Holding and achieved its greatest success – in 2005, winning promotion to the first division (Ekstraklasa). Since then Korona has spent five seasons in the Polish soccer top level. In the 2006–07 season Korona played in the final of the Polish Cup. Convicted of match-fixing in previous years,  the club was relegated to I liga after the 2007–08 season. After a one-year banishment, Korona returned to the Ekstraklasa. In the 2019–20 season, Korona finished in 14th place and were relegated to I liga. On 29 May 2022 Korona returned to the Ekstraklasa following a 3–2 win over Chrobry Głogów in the promotion play-off final.

Biggest achievements
 Ekstraklasa:
5th place (3): 2006–07, 2012–13, 2017–18
 Polish Cup:
Finalist (1): 2007–08
Semi-finalist (2): 2006–07, 2018–19
 Polish League Cup:
Quarterfinal (1): 2007–08
 Youth Teams:
Polish U-19 Champion: 2008–09
 Polish U-19 runners-up: 1997

History
The club was founded in 1973 after the union of two clubs from Kielce – Iskra and SHL. The new club got its first promotion to the Polish 2nd league in 1975. Unfortunately, the team did not play very well and was soon relegated. The next promotion was in 1982. Korona played in the 2nd league until 1990 when it was once again relegated. 1996 brought several changes. Nida Gips from Gacki became the new sponsor and the club's name changed to Miejski Klub Sportowy Sekcja Futbolowa Korona. During the 1998–99 season, Korona again played in the 2nd league but dropped down at the end of the season. In 2000 Korona merged with another club from Kielce – Błękitni Kielce and was renamed to Kielecki Klub Piłkarski Korona.

In 2002, the golden era for Korona had begun. Kolporter became the new sponsor, Krzysztof Klicki the new chairman, and the club's name changed to Kielecki Klub Piłkarski Kolporter Korona. In 2003, the team was again renamed, this time to Sportowa Spólka Akcyjna Kolporter Korona. The goal was simple – to be the best Polish football team. The dream started to become reality in 2005 when Korona won the 2nd league and for the first time in the club's history was promoted to the Polish premier league.

Korona's first match in the Ekstraklasa was against Cracovia and the final score was 0–0. Korona ended the 2005–06 season fifth in the league table. Prior to the 2006–07 season, at a meeting with supporters, the chairman announced that club would revert to its historical coat of arms. Korona's second season in the Ekstraklasa started off strongly with an away win against Arka Gdynia (3–0). 20 September 2006 was a significant one in Korona's history. After an away victory against Odra Wodzisław Śląski, the club climbed to the top of the league table for the first time in its history although it ended the 2006–07 season in 7th place. Its third and final season in the top division was 2007–08, placing 6th but being relegated for its involvement in match-fixing in the 2003–04 season. In August 2008, Klicki sold the club to the city of Kielce for a nominal fee.

On 14 July 2009, Korona Kielce was promoted to the Ekstraklasa. In 2020, they were relegated back to I liga. In 2022, they were once again promoted to the Ekstraklasa.

Stadium

In response to Korona's successes and the club owner, Krzysztof Klicki's, affirmation that the club would play in the premier league and battle for European cups, Kielce municipal authorities approved the construction of a new stadium. Unfortunately, the stadium turned out to be much too small. Because of this the club played its first round in the highest division at its old stadium (currently used by reserves and youth teams) to permit further work on the new facility.

Only eighteen months after the start of the building project, the keys of the new stadium were officially handed to the club. The first premier league match was played on 1 April 2006 against Zagłębie Lubin.

The Korona stadium, although it stands on the same site as an earlier stadium, is an entirely new facility, built according to UEFA recommendations and modern design ideas. In this way it differs from most other football stadiums in Poland which were built during the communist era or earlier and only slightly modernized to meet basic UEFA standards.

Kielce stadium can seat 15,550 fans, however, due to Polish regulations, which require a buffer zone between local fans and the visitors section, league matches can only accommodate 13,823 Korona fans and 777 visiting fans. However, on one occasion the stadium was full to capacity during a league match. This occurred during the 2006–07 season when fans of visiting club Legia Warszawa were prohibited from entering due to the vast number of their 'red brigade' supporters who made the trip down to watch their club in Kielce.

Pitch dimensions are 105 x 68 m, and the entire surface is heated. Automatic sprinklers water the pitch in between match days. Kielce stadium has a complete system of monitoring, which could serve as a model for other Polish stadiums. Korona's stadium is also considered by the Polish Football Association for international games.

Since 2006, when the club moved to the most modern stadium in Poland, it often had among the best attendance statistics in the Polish league, although these numbers have declined since the club's relegation at the end of the 2007–08 season.

Club crest
A new club crest was introduced in 2002, featuring a redesigned coat of arms. However, many fans were disappointed by the removal of the beloved black crown from the emblem.

Before season 2006–07 in a team meeting with supporters the chairman announced that the club would return to the historical coat of arms. Thanks to the fans and good will of the chairman Korona again has the crown in her coat of arms.

Supporters

Supporters of Korona are some of the most enthusiastic in the Ekstraklasa and have received many awards for their artistic match 'frames'. In the spring round of 2006–07, Korona Kielce fans were awarded 5 times in 8 matches for their superb 'frames'.

Korona supporters' tireless cheering for their team often helps their team to victories. The most faithful fans are seated in the "Młyn" – "the Mill" – which contains 500 – 2,000 people.

On 14 June 2006, the Stowarzyszenie Kibiców Korony Kielce "Złocisto-Krwiści" (Korona Kielce Supporters Association "Golden-Blooded") was officially registered at a Kielce court. Official appointing of Korona Kielce fans had become a fact. This association brings together representatives of various Korona supporters groups.

The association is a partner for the club and many institutions, which it wants to cooperate with. The fans are invaluable in the creation of memorable football events, and the association has an important role in increasing fan input on football life in Korona. The most important role of the association however is to improve the quality of support.

The association also organizes special trains and coaches for fans for away matches. It also organizes events promoting the Club such as "Golden-bloody stadium in Kielce", "Small toy – children's benefit" (fans donated toys to an orphanage), "Action Banner" (a lot of flags and banners were sewed). In short, the association has introduced a new supporting style at Korona matches which will attract even more fans to the stadium on Ściegiennego street.

Korona Kielce fans have a friendship with fans of Stal Mielec and Sandecja Nowy Sącz.

Their biggest rivals are KSZO Ostrowiec Świętokrzyski with whom they contest the Holy Cross Province derby. Other fierce rivals are Radomiak Radom and Wisła Kraków.

Korona Kielce II

The club operates a reserve team.

Ownership
Majority shareholder of the club is former German international footballer Dieter Burdenski. In April 2017, he acquired 72% of the club shares while the remaining 28% are in hands of the city of Kielce. Burdenski's son Fabian was subsequently signed by the club in June 2017.

Current squad

Out on loan

Other players under contract

Notable players
The following players received international caps for their respective countries. Players whose name is listed in bold represented their countries while playing for Korona Kielce.

 Poland
 Grzegorz Bonin (2005–08)
 Piotr Celeban (2007–08)
 Radosław Cierzniak (2007–10)
 Paweł Golański (2005–07) (2010–15)
 Artur Jędrzejczyk (2010)
 Marcin Kaczmarek (2005–08)
 Arkadiusz Kaliszan (2004–06)
 Jacek Kiełb (2006–10) (2011–12) (2013–15) (2016–2018) (2020–)
 Wojciech Kowalewski (2007–08)
 Marcin Kuś (2007–08)
 Andrzej Niedzielan (2010–11)
 Grzegorz Piechna (2004–06)
 Piotr Świerczewski (2007–08)
 Maciej Wilusz (2015)
 Łukasz Załuska (2004–07)
 Marcin Żewłakow (2012–13)
 Michał Żyro (2019–2020)
 Belarus
 Yevgeniy Shikavka (2022–)
 Dzmitry Verkhawtsow (2016)
 Bosnia and Herzegovina
 Vlastimir Jovanović (2010–16)
 Adnan Kovačević (2017–20)
 Bulgaria
 Iliyan Mitsanski (2007) (2017)
 Canada
 Milan Borjan (2017)
 Charlie Trafford (2015–17)
 Costa Rica
 Felicio Brown Forbes (2018–19)
 Czech Republic
 Michal Papadopoulos (2019–2020)
 Estonia
 Ken Kallaste (2016–19)
 Sander Puri (2011)
 Finland
 Petteri Forsell (2020)
 France
 Olivier Kapo (2014–15)
 Georgia
 Vato Arveladze (2018–20)
 Nika Kacharava (2017–18)
 Kazakhstan
 Sergei Khizhnichenko (2014)
 Latvia
 Aleksandrs Fertovs (2015–16)
 Vladislavs Gabovs (2015–17)
 Lithuania
 Vytautas Černiauskas (2014–15)
 Andrius Skerla (2007–08)
 Moldova
 Anatolie Doroș (2005–06)
 Montenegro
 Saša Balić (2022–23)
 New Zealand
 Themistoklis Tzimopoulos (2019–2021)
 Senegal
 Elhadji Pape Diaw (2016–19)
 Serbia
 Nemanja Miletić (2019–2020)
 Slovakia
 Erik Pačinda (2019–2020)
 Slovenia
 Goran Cvijanović  (2017–18)

Managers

 Zbigniew Pawlak (1973)
 Bogumił Gozdur (1973–77)
 Zbigniew Lepczyk (1978)
 Marian Szczechowicz (1979)
 Wojciech Niedźwiedzki (1979–80)
 Antoni Hermanowicz (1980–83)
 Józef Golla (1983–84)
 Czesław Palik (July 1, 1984 – June 30, 1985)
 Czesław Fudalej (1985)
 Witold Sokołowski (1986)
 Antoni Hermanowicz (1986)
 Bogumił Gozdur (1986)
 Antoni Hermanowicz (1987–88)
 Czesław Palik (July 1, 1988 – Dec 31, 1991)
 Volodymyr Bulhakov (1992)
 Marian Puchalski (1993)
 Antoni Hermanowicz (1993)
 Marek Parzyszek (1994)
 Czesław Palik (July 1, 1994 – June 30, 1996)
 Włodzimierz Gąsior (July 1, 1996 – June 30, 1999)
 Stanisław Gielarek (1999)
 Antoni Hermanowicz (2000)
 Jacek Zieliński I (July 1, 2000 – Dec 20, 2000)
 Czesław Palik (Jan 1, 2001 – June 30, 2001)
 Robert Orłowski (July 1, 2001–02)
 Tomasz Muchiński (2002 – Sept 23, 2002)
 Dariusz Wdowczyk (Sept 23, 2002 – Dec 12, 2004)
 Ryszard Wieczorek (Dec 13, 2004 – May 7, 2007)
 Jacek Zieliński II (July 1, 2007 – May 17, 2008)
 Włodzimierz Gąsior (June 3, 2008 – May 4, 2009)
 Marek Motyka (May 18, 2009 – Nov 23, 2009)
 Marcin Gawron (interim) (Nov 24, 2009 – Nov 29, 2009)
 Marcin Sasal (Nov 29, 2009 – May 12, 2011)
 Włodzimierz Gąsior (interim) (May 12, 2011 – June 9, 2011)
 Leszek Ojrzyński (July 1, 2011 – Aug 5, 2013)
 Sławomir Grzesik (interim) (Aug 5, 2013 – Aug 13, 2013)
 Pacheta (Aug 13, 2013 – June 2014)
 Ryszard Tarasiewicz (June 17, 2014 – June 10, 2015)
 Marcin Brosz (June 25, 2015 – June 30, 2016)
 Tomasz Wilman (June 30, 2016 – November 10, 2016)
 Maciej Bartoszek (November 10, 2016 – June 30, 2017)
 Gino Lettieri (July 1, 2017 – August 31, 2019)
 Mirosław Smyła (September 16, 2019 - March 6, 2020)
 Maciej Bartoszek (March 6, 2020 - April 15, 2021)
 Dominik Nowak (April 16, 2021 – November 29, 2021)
 Leszek Ojrzyński (December 17, 2021 – October 29, 2022)
 Kamil Kuzera (October 29, 2022 – present)

See also
 Football in Poland
 Polish Cup
 Poland national football team
 List of football teams

References

External links

 Official website 
 Unofficial website 
 Fan site 
 Fans forum 
 facebook
 twitter
 instagram

 
Football clubs in Świętokrzyskie Voivodeship
Sport in Kielce
Association football clubs established in 1973
1973 establishments in Poland